The 1933 Pittsburgh Pirates season was the 52nd season of the Pittsburgh Pirates franchise; the 47th in the National League. The Pirates finished second in the league standings with a record of 87–67.

Regular season

Season standings

Record vs. opponents

Game log

|- bgcolor="ccffcc"
| 1 || April 12 || @ Reds || 4–1 || Swift (1–0) || Johnson || — || 25,305 || 1–0
|- bgcolor="ccffcc"
| 2 || April 13 || @ Reds || 5–2 || French (1–0) || Rixey || — || — || 2–0
|- bgcolor="ccffcc"
| 3 || April 15 || @ Cubs || 6–4 (10) || Harris (1–0) || Grimes || — || — || 3–0
|- bgcolor="ffbbbb"
| 4 || April 18 || @ Cubs || 1–3 || Warneke || Swetonic (0–1) || — || — || 3–1
|- bgcolor="ccffcc"
| 5 || April 21 || Reds || 5–1 || Swift (2–0) || Johnson || Harris (1) || — || 4–1
|- bgcolor="ccffcc"
| 6 || April 22 || Reds || 6–5 (10) || French (2–0) || Smith || — || — || 5–1
|- bgcolor="ccffcc"
| 7 || April 23 || @ Cardinals || 4–0 || Meine (1–0) || Vance || — || — || 6–1
|- bgcolor="ccffcc"
| 8 || April 23 || @ Cardinals || 6–2 || Hoyt (1–0) || Walker || — || — || 7–1
|- bgcolor="ffbbbb"
| 9 || April 25 || @ Cardinals || 3–10 || Hallahan || Swetonic (0–2) || — || — || 7–2
|- bgcolor="ffbbbb"
| 10 || April 27 || Cubs || 2–3 || Bush || Swift (2–1) || — || — || 7–3
|- bgcolor="ccffcc"
| 11 || April 28 || Cardinals || 2–0 || French (3–0) || Mooney || — || — || 8–3
|- bgcolor="ccffcc"
| 12 || April 29 || Cardinals || 6–4 || Meine (2–0) || Walker || — || — || 9–3
|- bgcolor="ccffcc"
| 13 || April 30 || @ Reds || 8–1 || Hoyt (2–0) || Johnson || — || — || 10–3
|-

|- bgcolor="ccffcc"
| 14 || May 1 || @ Phillies || 10–0 || Swift (3–1) || Collins || — || — || 11–3
|- bgcolor="ffbbbb"
| 15 || May 2 || @ Phillies || 5–6 || Rhem || French (3–1) || — || — || 11–4
|- bgcolor="ccffcc"
| 16 || May 4 || @ Dodgers || 2–1 (10) || Meine (3–0) || Clark || — || — || 12–4
|- bgcolor="ccffcc"
| 17 || May 5 || @ Dodgers || 4–2 || Swift (4–1) || Mungo || — || — || 13–4
|- bgcolor="ccffcc"
| 18 || May 8 || @ Braves || 3–0 || French (4–1) || Zachary || — || — || 14–4
|- bgcolor="ffbbbb"
| 19 || May 9 || @ Braves || 0–7 || Frankhouse || Hoyt (2–1) || — || — || 14–5
|- bgcolor="ccffcc"
| 20 || May 11 || @ Giants || 7–6 || Meine (4–0) || Hubbell || Harris (2) || — || 15–5
|- bgcolor="ffbbbb"
| 21 || May 12 || @ Giants || 3–11 || Schumacher || Swift (4–2) || — || — || 15–6
|- bgcolor="ffbbbb"
| 22 || May 13 || @ Giants || 1–2 (11) || Luque || French (4–2) || — || 6,000 || 15–7
|- bgcolor="ffbbbb"
| 23 || May 14 || @ Giants || 1–5 || Parmelee || Hoyt (2–2) || — || — || 15–8
|- bgcolor="ccffcc"
| 24 || May 15 || Phillies || 5–4 || Meine (5–0) || Elliott || — || — || 16–8
|- bgcolor="ccffcc"
| 25 || May 16 || Phillies || 8–4 || Swift (5–2) || Moore || — || — || 17–8
|- bgcolor="ccffcc"
| 26 || May 17 || Phillies || 6–4 || Smith (1–0) || Collins || — || — || 18–8
|- bgcolor="ccffcc"
| 27 || May 18 || Phillies || 6–2 || Swetonic (1–2) || Rhem || — || — || 19–8
|- bgcolor="ffbbbb"
| 28 || May 19 || Braves || 3–5 || Zachary || Hoyt (2–3) || Seibold || — || 19–9
|- bgcolor="ffbbbb"
| 29 || May 20 || Braves || 2–4 || Cantwell || Meine (5–1) || — || — || 19–10
|- bgcolor="ccffcc"
| 30 || May 20 || Braves || 7–6 || Harris (2–0) || Betts || — || — || 20–10
|- bgcolor="ffbbbb"
| 31 || May 22 || Dodgers || 0–3 || Clark || French (4–3) || — || — || 20–11
|- bgcolor="ccffcc"
| 32 || May 23 || Dodgers || 3–0 || Swetonic (2–2) || Carroll || — || — || 21–11
|- bgcolor="ccffcc"
| 33 || May 24 || Dodgers || 6–5 (10) || Chagnon (1–0) || Mungo || — || 2,000 || 22–11
|- bgcolor="ffbbbb"
| 34 || May 26 || Giants || 5–6 || Bell || Harris (2–1) || — || — || 22–12
|- bgcolor="ccffcc"
| 35 || May 28 || @ Reds || 4–2 || French (5–3) || Lucas || — || — || 23–12
|- bgcolor="ffbbbb"
| 36 || May 28 || @ Reds || 0–4 || Rixey || Swetonic (2–3) || — || — || 23–13
|- bgcolor="ccffcc"
| 37 || May 30 || Cubs || 2–1 || Swift (6–2) || Grimes || — || — || 24–13
|- bgcolor="ffbbbb"
| 38 || May 30 || Cubs || 2–6 || Malone || Meine (5–2) || — || — || 24–14
|- bgcolor="ffbbbb"
| 39 || May 31 || Cubs || 1–5 || Root || Swetonic (2–4) || — || — || 24–15
|-

|- bgcolor="ffbbbb"
| 40 || June 3 || Reds || 5–9 || Benton || Harris (2–2) || — || — || 24–16
|- bgcolor="ffbbbb"
| 41 || June 3 || Reds || 4–5 || Kolp || Swift (6–3) || Quinn || — || 24–17
|- bgcolor="ccffcc"
| 42 || June 4 || @ Cubs || 9–3 || Swetonic (3–4) || Grimes || Harris (3) || — || 25–17
|- bgcolor="ffbbbb"
| 43 || June 4 || @ Cubs || 2–9 || Malone || Meine (5–3) || — || — || 25–18
|- bgcolor="ffbbbb"
| 44 || June 6 || @ Cubs || 3–5 || Tinning || Chagnon (1–1) || Bush || — || 25–19
|- bgcolor="ffbbbb"
| 45 || June 7 || @ Cubs || 2–7 || Bush || Swift (6–4) || — || — || 25–20
|- bgcolor="ffbbbb"
| 46 || June 8 || Reds || 2–8 || Rixey || French (5–4) || — || — || 25–21
|- bgcolor="ccffcc"
| 47 || June 9 || Reds || 2–0 || Swetonic (4–4) || Derringer || — || — || 26–21
|- bgcolor="ccffcc"
| 48 || June 10 || Reds || 4–3 || Swift (7–4) || Kolp || — || — || 27–21
|- bgcolor="ccffcc"
| 49 || June 11 || @ Cardinals || 11–7 || Kremer (1–0) || Carleton || Harris (4) || — || 28–21
|- bgcolor="ccffcc"
| 50 || June 11 || @ Cardinals || 3–0 || French (6–4) || Walker || — || — || 29–21
|- bgcolor="ffbbbb"
| 51 || June 13 || @ Cardinals || 3–4 || Dean || Swetonic (4–5) || — || — || 29–22
|- bgcolor="ffbbbb"
| 52 || June 14 || @ Cardinals || 2–3 || Hallahan || Meine (5–4) || — || — || 29–23
|- bgcolor="ffbbbb"
| 53 || June 15 || @ Cubs || 0–5 || Tinning || Smith (1–1) || — || — || 29–24
|- bgcolor="ffbbbb"
| 54 || June 16 || @ Cubs || 1–9 || Bush || Swift (7–5) || — || 26,000 || 29–25
|- bgcolor="ccffcc"
| 55 || June 17 || Cubs || 4–3 || Swetonic (5–5) || Malone || — || — || 30–25
|- bgcolor="ccffcc"
| 56 || June 18 || @ Braves || 5–3 || Meine (6–4) || Brandt || — || — || 31–25
|- bgcolor="ccffcc"
| 57 || June 18 || @ Braves || 4–3 (8) || French (7–4) || Betts || — || — || 32–25
|- bgcolor="ccffcc"
| 58 || June 20 || @ Braves || 6–2 || Swift (8–5) || Zachary || — || — || 33–25
|- bgcolor="ffbbbb"
| 59 || June 21 || @ Braves || 5–6 || Cantwell || Harris (2–3) || Zachary || — || 33–26
|- bgcolor="ffbbbb"
| 60 || June 21 || @ Braves || 3–5 || Mangum || Swetonic (5–6) || — || — || 33–27
|- bgcolor="ffbbbb"
| 61 || June 22 || @ Dodgers || 0–9 || Benge || Meine (6–5) || — || 4,000 || 33–28
|- bgcolor="ffbbbb"
| 62 || June 23 || @ Dodgers || 4–5 || Carroll || French (7–5) || Shaute || — || 33–29
|- bgcolor="ccffcc"
| 63 || June 24 || @ Dodgers || 15–3 || Swift (9–5) || Thurston || — || 10,000 || 34–29
|- bgcolor="ccffcc"
| 64 || June 25 || @ Dodgers || 5–2 || Chagnon (2–1) || Mungo || — || — || 35–29
|- bgcolor="ffbbbb"
| 65 || June 25 || @ Dodgers || 1–9 || Beck || Hoyt (2–4) || — || 25,000 || 35–30
|- bgcolor="ccffcc"
| 66 || June 28 || @ Giants || 5–2 || Swetonic (6–6) || Hubbell || — || — || 36–30
|- bgcolor="ffbbbb"
| 67 || June 28 || @ Giants || 4–7 (10) || Uhle || French (7–6) || — || 15,000 || 36–31
|- bgcolor="ffbbbb"
| 68 || June 29 || @ Phillies || 4–6 || Elliott || Meine (6–6) || Rhem || — || 36–32
|- bgcolor="ffbbbb"
| 69 || June 30 || @ Phillies || 4–5 || Pickrel || French (7–7) || — || — || 36–33
|-

|- bgcolor="ffbbbb"
| 70 || July 1 || @ Phillies || 8–13 || Hansen || Chagnon (2–2) || — || — || 36–34
|- bgcolor="ccffcc"
| 71 || July 1 || @ Phillies || 4–3 || Smith (2–1) || Collins || — || — || 37–34
|- bgcolor="ffbbbb"
| 72 || July 4 || Cardinals || 1–5 || Hallahan || Swetonic (6–7) || — || — || 37–35
|- bgcolor="ccffcc"
| 73 || July 4 || Cardinals || 4–2 || French (8–7) || Mooney || — || — || 38–35
|- bgcolor="ccffcc"
| 74 || July 5 || Cardinals || 7–6 || Hoyt (3–4) || Johnson || French (1) || 7,000 || 39–35
|- bgcolor="ffbbbb"
| 75 || July 8 || Phillies || 7–8 || Liska || Swetonic (6–8) || Rhem || — || 39–36
|- bgcolor="ccffcc"
| 76 || July 8 || Phillies || 3–0 || Smith (3–1) || Jackson || — || — || 40–36
|- bgcolor="ccffcc"
| 77 || July 10 || Phillies || 3–2 || French (9–7) || Holley || — || — || 41–36
|- bgcolor="ffbbbb"
| 78 || July 11 || Braves || 3–5 || Zachary || Swetonic (6–9) || — || — || 41–37
|- bgcolor="ccffcc"
| 79 || July 12 || Braves || 9–8 (10) || French (10–7) || Betts || — || — || 42–37
|- bgcolor="ccffcc"
| 80 || July 13 || Braves || 8–3 || Smith (4–1) || Cantwell || — || — || 43–37
|- bgcolor="ffbbbb"
| 81 || July 14 || Braves || 3–4 (10) || Frankhouse || French (10–8) || — || — || 43–38
|- bgcolor="ccffcc"
| 82 || July 17 || Dodgers || 14–2 || Swift (10–5) || Carroll || — || 7,500 || 44–38
|- bgcolor="ccffcc"
| 83 || July 17 || Dodgers || 7–0 || Swetonic (7–9) || Benge || — || — || 45–38
|- bgcolor="ccffcc"
| 84 || July 18 || Dodgers || 11–8 || Hoyt (4–4) || Thurston || — || 2,500 || 46–38
|- bgcolor="ccffcc"
| 85 || July 19 || Giants || 4–1 || French (11–8) || Fitzsimmons || — || — || 47–38
|- bgcolor="ffbbbb"
| 86 || July 19 || Giants || 3–7 || Hubbell || Smith (4–2) || — || 20,000 || 47–39
|- bgcolor="ccffcc"
| 87 || July 20 || Giants || 6–5 || Meine (7–6) || Luque || — || — || 48–39
|- bgcolor="ffbbbb"
| 88 || July 21 || Giants || 5–6 || Clark || Hoyt (4–5) || — || 3,000 || 48–40
|- bgcolor="ffbbbb"
| 89 || July 22 || Giants || 0–1 || Hubbell || French (11–9) || — || 25,000 || 48–41
|- bgcolor="ccffcc"
| 90 || July 22 || Giants || 7–2 || Meine (8–6) || Parmelee || — || 27,000 || 49–41
|- bgcolor="ffbbbb"
| 91 || July 23 || @ Reds || 1–6 || Lucas || Swift (10–6) || — || — || 49–42
|- bgcolor="ffbbbb"
| 92 || July 23 || @ Reds || 4–6 || Rixey || Chagnon (2–3) || Kolp || — || 49–43
|- bgcolor="ccffcc"
| 93 || July 25 || Cubs || 4–3 || Swetonic (8–9) || Bush || Hoyt (1) || 8,000 || 50–43
|- bgcolor="ccffcc"
| 94 || July 25 || Cubs || 4–1 || Smith (5–2) || Tinning || — || 10,000 || 51–43
|- bgcolor="ccffcc"
| 95 || July 27 || Cubs || 2–0 || French (12–9) || Root || — || — || 52–43
|- bgcolor="ccffcc"
| 96 || July 29 || Reds || 9–8 || Harris (3–3) || Benton || — || — || 53–43
|- bgcolor="ccffcc"
| 97 || July 29 || Reds || 6–4 || Chagnon (3–3) || Rixey || Harris (5) || — || 54–43
|- bgcolor="ccffcc"
| 98 || July 30 || @ Reds || 5–4 || Chagnon (4–3) || Derringer || — || — || 55–43
|- bgcolor="ccffcc"
| 99 || July 30 || @ Reds || 8–6 || Harris (4–3) || Benton || Chagnon (1) || — || 56–43
|-

|- bgcolor="ccffcc"
| 100 || August 1 || Cardinals || 9–3 || Swetonic (9–9) || Walker || Hoyt (2) || — || 57–43
|- bgcolor="ffbbbb"
| 101 || August 2 || Cardinals || 3–4 (12) || Haines || French (12–10) || — || — || 57–44
|- bgcolor="ffbbbb"
| 102 || August 3 || Cardinals || 1–4 (6) || Dean || Swift (10–7) || — || — || 57–45
|- bgcolor="ccffcc"
| 103 || August 4 || Cardinals || 5–4 || Meine (9–6) || Walker || — || — || 58–45
|- bgcolor="ccffcc"
| 104 || August 5 || @ Cubs || 6–2 || Smith (6–2) || Warneke || — || — || 59–45
|- bgcolor="ffbbbb"
| 105 || August 6 || @ Cubs || 0–6 || Malone || Swetonic (9–10) || — || — || 59–46
|- bgcolor="ffbbbb"
| 106 || August 11 || Cubs || 2–8 || Bush || French (12–11) || — || — || 59–47
|- bgcolor="ccffcc"
| 107 || August 12 || Cubs || 5–2 || Smith (7–2) || Malone || — || — || 60–47
|- bgcolor="ccffcc"
| 108 || August 12 || Cubs || 3–2 || Meine (10–6) || Root || — || — || 61–47
|- bgcolor="ffbbbb"
| 109 || August 13 || @ Cubs || 2–3 || Warneke || Swift (10–8) || — || — || 61–48
|- bgcolor="ffbbbb"
| 110 || August 16 || @ Dodgers || 1–2 (11) || Mungo || French (12–12) || — || 14,000 || 61–49
|- bgcolor="ccffcc"
| 111 || August 16 || @ Dodgers || 11–7 || Swetonic (10–10) || Carroll || Smith (1) || — || 62–49
|- bgcolor="ffbbbb"
| 112 || August 19 || @ Braves || 2–5 || Brandt || Meine (10–7) || — || — || 62–50
|- bgcolor="ffbbbb"
| 113 || August 20 || @ Braves || 4–5 (11) || Smith || Swetonic (10–11) || — || — || 62–51
|- bgcolor="ffbbbb"
| 114 || August 20 || @ Braves || 1–8 || Cantwell || Swift (10–9) || — || — || 62–52
|- bgcolor="ffbbbb"
| 115 || August 22 || @ Braves || 4–5 (14) || Frankhouse || Hoyt (4–6) || — || — || 62–53
|- bgcolor="ffbbbb"
| 116 || August 25 || @ Giants || 5–8 (11) || Luque || Swetonic (10–12) || — || — || 62–54
|- bgcolor="ffbbbb"
| 117 || August 25 || @ Giants || 2–6 || Parmelee || Meine (10–8) || — || — || 62–55
|- bgcolor="ffbbbb"
| 118 || August 26 || @ Giants || 1–2 || Hubbell || Smith (7–3) || — || — || 62–56
|- bgcolor="ccffcc"
| 119 || August 26 || @ Giants || 7–2 || Birkofer (1–0) || Clark || Hoyt (3) || 45,000 || 63–56
|- bgcolor="ccffcc"
| 120 || August 28 || @ Phillies || 9–5 || Chagnon (5–3) || Elliott || — || — || 64–56
|- bgcolor="ccffcc"
| 121 || August 28 || @ Phillies || 9–1 || French (13–12) || Holley || — || — || 65–56
|- bgcolor="ccffcc"
| 122 || August 29 || @ Phillies || 4–1 || Meine (11–8) || Hansen || — || — || 66–56
|- bgcolor="ccffcc"
| 123 || August 30 || @ Phillies || 5–1 || Birkofer (2–0) || Ragland || — || — || 67–56
|- bgcolor="ccffcc"
| 124 || August 31 || @ Phillies || 13–11 || Swetonic (11–12) || Rhem || Hoyt (4) || — || 68–56
|-

|- bgcolor="ccffcc"
| 125 || September 1 || Cardinals || 2–1 (11) || French (14–12) || Hallahan || — || — || 69–56
|- bgcolor="ccffcc"
| 126 || September 2 || Cardinals || 4–1 || Meine (12–8) || Walker || — || — || 70–56
|- bgcolor="ffbbbb"
| 127 || September 3 || @ Reds || 3–9 || Lucas || Birkofer (2–1) || — || — || 70–57
|- bgcolor="ccffcc"
| 128 || September 4 || Reds || 1–0 || Smith (8–3) || Johnson || — || — || 71–57
|- bgcolor="ccffcc"
| 129 || September 5 || Giants || 6–1 || French (15–12) || Hubbell || — || 5,000 || 72–57
|- bgcolor="ccffcc"
| 130 || September 6 || Giants || 6–5 (10) || Swift (11–9) || Bell || — || — || 73–57
|- bgcolor="ffbbbb"
| 131 || September 6 || Giants || 1–9 || Schumacher || Birkofer (2–2) || — || 20,000 || 73–58
|- bgcolor="ccffcc"
| 132 || September 7 || Giants || 14–2 || Meine (13–8) || Parmelee || — || 9,000 || 74–58
|- bgcolor="ffbbbb"
| 133 || September 8 || Giants || 1–2 || Hubbell || Smith (8–4) || — || — || 74–59
|- bgcolor="ccffcc"
| 134 || September 9 || Dodgers || 6–2 || French (16–12) || Benge || — || — || 75–59
|- bgcolor="ffbbbb"
| 135 || September 9 || Dodgers || 7–8 || Carroll || Chagnon (5–4) || Ryan || 9,000 || 75–60
|- bgcolor="ccffcc"
| 136 || September 10 || @ Dodgers || 2–1 || Swift (12–9) || Beck || — || — || 76–60
|- bgcolor="ffbbbb"
| 137 || September 10 || @ Dodgers || 2–3 || Mungo || Harris (4–4) || — || 15,000 || 76–61
|- bgcolor="ccffcc"
| 138 || September 12 || Dodgers || 1–0 || Meine (14–8) || Thurston || — || — || 77–61
|- bgcolor="ccffcc"
| 139 || September 12 || Dodgers || 2–0 || Hoyt (5–6) || Leonard || — || 2,000 || 78–61
|- bgcolor="ccffcc"
| 140 || September 13 || Braves || 1–0 || French (17–12) || Cantwell || — || — || 79–61
|- bgcolor="ffbbbb"
| 141 || September 15 || Braves || 1–10 || Brandt || Smith (8–5) || — || — || 79–62
|- bgcolor="ffbbbb"
| 142 || September 16 || Braves || 4–6 || Betts || Swift (12–10) || — || — || 79–63
|- bgcolor="ccffcc"
| 143 || September 16 || Braves || 10–0 || Birkofer (3–2) || Zachary || — || — || 80–63
|- bgcolor="ccffcc"
| 144 || September 18 || Phillies || 2–1 || Meine (15–8) || Ragland || — || — || 81–63
|- bgcolor="ffbbbb"
| 145 || September 18 || Phillies || 0–6 || Holley || Hoyt (5–7) || — || — || 81–64
|- bgcolor="ccffcc"
| 146 || September 19 || Phillies || 2–1 || French (18–12) || Grabowski || — || — || 82–64
|- bgcolor="ffbbbb"
| 147 || September 19 || Phillies || 2–3 || Collins || Smith (8–6) || — || — || 82–65
|- bgcolor="ccffcc"
| 148 || September 20 || Dodgers || 3–0 || Swift (13–10) || Beck || — || — || 83–65
|- bgcolor="ccffcc"
| 149 || September 23 || @ Cardinals || 9–3 || Birkofer (4–2) || Hallahan || — || — || 84–65
|- bgcolor="ffbbbb"
| 150 || September 24 || @ Cardinals || 4–5 || Carleton || French (18–13) || — || — || 84–66
|- bgcolor="ccffcc"
| 151 || September 24 || @ Cardinals || 5–4 (10) || Chagnon (6–4) || Dean || — || — || 85–66
|- bgcolor="ffbbbb"
| 152 || September 25 || @ Cardinals || 3–6 || Walker || Smith (8–7) || — || — || 85–67
|-

|- bgcolor="ccffcc"
| 153 || October 1 || @ Reds || 7–5 || Swift (14–10) || Lucas || — || — || 86–67
|- bgcolor="ccffcc"
| 154 || October 1 || @ Reds || 6–5 (10) || Swetonic (12–12) || Kolp || — || — || 87–67
|-

|-
| Legend:       = Win       = LossBold = Pirates team member

Opening Day lineup

Roster

Player stats

Batting

Starters by position 
Note: Pos = Position; G = Games played; AB = At bats; H = Hits; Avg. = Batting average; HR = Home runs; RBI = Runs batted in

Other batters 
Note: G = Games played; AB = At bats; H = Hits; Avg. = Batting average; HR = Home runs; RBI = Runs batted in

Pitching

Starting pitchers 
Note: G = Games pitched; IP = Innings pitched; W = Wins; L = Losses; ERA = Earned run average; SO = Strikeouts

Other pitchers 
Note: G = Games pitched; IP = Innings pitched; W = Wins; L = Losses; ERA = Earned run average; SO = Strikeouts

Relief pitchers 
Note: G = Games pitched; W = Wins; L = Losses; SV = Saves; ERA = Earned run average; SO = Strikeouts

Awards and honors 
1933 Major League Baseball All-Star Game
Pie Traynor, reserve
Paul Waner, reserve

League top five finishers 
Tony Piet
 #3 in NL in batting average (.323)

Pie Traynor
 #4 in NL in hits (190)

Arky Vaughan
 #3 in NL in on-base percentage (.388)
 #5 in NL in RBI (97)
 #5 in NL in slugging percentage (.478)

Paul Waner
 #2 in NL in runs scored (101)
 #3 in NL in hits (191)

Farm system

Notes

References 
 1933 Pittsburgh Pirates team page at Baseball Reference
 1933 Pittsburgh Pirates Page at Baseball Almanac

Pittsburgh Pirates seasons
Pittsburgh Pirates season
Pittsburg Pir